The 2016 Japanese Formula 3 Championship was the 38th edition of the Japanese Formula 3 Championship.

Teams and drivers
All teams were Japanese-registered.

Race calendar and results
A provisional calendar for the 2016 championship. All races are scheduled to be held in Japan.

The Autopolis round was cancelled on May 29 due to damages caused by the Kumamoto earthquake. However, on July 15, it was decided that Okayama would take its place at the same date.

Championship standings

Drivers' Championships
Points are awarded as follows:

Overall

National Class

References

External links
  

Japanese Formula 3 Championship seasons
Formula Three
Japan Formula Three
Japanese Formula 3